Gymnastics events have been staged at the Olympic Games since 1896, with women competing for the time at the 1928 Olympic Games. German female gymnasts participated in the 1936 and 1952 Olympics prior to the separation of East and West Germany.  At the 1960 and 1964 Olympics they competed as a United Team of Germany.  Between 1968–1988 East Germany and West Germany competed separately.  Since 1992 a unified Germany has sent at least one female gymnast to compete the Olympic Games with the exception of 2000.  Kim Bui and Elisabeth Seitz have represented Germany at the most Olympic Games with three. Ute Starke also competed at three Olympics but represented the United Team of Germany twice and East Germany once.

Gymnasts

Medalists

See also
 List of Olympic male artistic gymnasts for Germany

References

Germany